Brian Andreas (born 1956) is the pen name of Kai Andreas Skye, an American writer, artist, publisher and speaker widely known for his simple and poetic short stories of 50 to 100 words, often accompanied by distinctive color drawings. The stories range from wry comic commentary to elegant and direct meditations on themes of love, relationships, and being alive now.

His two dimensional work takes the form of pen and ink drawings, gouache watercolors with original hand-written texts, books incorporating both art and the writings, and colorful art prints. His three dimensional and mixed-media sculptural work as of 2021 often incorporates reclaimed wood in both lyrical & representational shapes, bright colors, drawing & handwritten text in graphite. His latest sculptural work references the palimpsests of antiquity with multiple sanded layers of gesso ground, paint & saturated ink layers & handwritten texts underneath the final artwork.  The mixed-media sculptures incorporating salvaged wood in deliberately crude shapes, bright colors, hand drawings (especially faces) and rubber-stamped imprints of his writings went out of production at StoryPeople in June, 2015.

In 1994, Skye founded an Iowa company, StoryPeople, to distribute his work worldwide. In 2012 he founded tumblecloud.com, a collaborative digital storytelling platform. In 2014, he founded brianandreas.com as a platform for his original art and his other creative projects. In 2015, he was a key collaborator in the formation of A Hundred Ways North, a company focused on using stories and workshops to transform the ways people find and sustain community. In 2016, he signed an exclusive arrangement to distribute his new writing and artwork with Flying Edna. That continues to be the case today.

In 2016, Skye legally changed his name to Kai Andreas Skye. He continues to use the pen name Brian Andreas in his older published work and his legal name, Kai Skye, in his work after June, 2020.

Per a 2019 divorce decree in Iowa, Skyes no longer holds any rights to his art and writing before September 2012, nor is he associated with StoryPeople, the company he founded and created. His earlier stories, prints and books to September 2012 continue to be released by StoryPeople. The work created after September 2012 is published for both national and international audiences by Flying Edna.

He currently lives in Massachusetts.

Background
Andreas was born in 1956 in Iowa City and grew up in Chicago, Illinois. He graduated from Luther College in Decorah, Iowa, in 1979 with a BA in Theater and English.  He went on to receive his MFA in Fiber and Mixed Media in 1992 from the John F. Kennedy University in Orinda, California, where he focused on Fiber, with an emphasis on story as the fiber of human community. It was during 1992-1993, in conjunction with the Graduate School of Arts and Consciousness at JFK University, that he coordinated an early Internet experiment in collaborative storytelling called the Hall of Whispers.

Hall of Whispers 
Andreas set out to ask people to share stories about their experience of being alive, using the Internet of the early 1990s. Of this experiment, he wrote:

"Hall of Whispers takes its name from an ancient Babylonian myth of a specially constructed room in one of the ziggurats (stepped pyramids), in which the walls were so highly polished that a whisper would stay alive forever. I have an image of the electronic networks whispering ceaselessly with the voices of our times.

"The form of the project is deceptively simple ... to create a situation ... where we could join each other around a technological campfire ... to create a virtual community using an ancient fundamental of community-making: shared stories ... a council model for understanding our world ... that it is in the sharing that greater wisdom evolves. Finally, in a turbulent world, it is easy to lose sight of the small beauties and moments of grace that occur constantly around us. I wanted Hall of Whispers to give voice to that side of ourselves that recognizes that this is as much a time of renewal as it is a time of decay."

Using the nascent Internet as well as fax, phone and standard mail, Skye ultimately gathered more than 4,000 stories from around the world.

StoryPeople
At the time of Hall of Whispers, Skye was living with his former spouse in Berkeley, and was focusing artistically on stone sculpting. "I had lots of white, black and beige around but no color."[9] The first StoryPeople sculpture was made from a board pulled from a dilapidated fence outside of his Berkeley, California studio. It was cut it into a stylized human figure, and then painted it in bright colors. Further experiments with these figures included hand stamped text along with the color and a softly blended face. Soon, these sculptural 'people' began to sell, first at the Marin Swap Meet in Sausalito, California, and then later at wine and music festivals in the San Francisco Bay area. Encouraged by the results, Skye and his family subsequently left Berkeley early in 1994 and returned to Decorah, Iowa, where he had previously graduated from Luther College. As the result of the Hall of Whispers and the fence-board experiments, it was written that "he discovered the StoryPeople waiting to be carved out of rough barn board, painted in bright colors, and hand-lettered with their individual stories." He "gives voice to the vision of the child and the unsophisticated in books that listen to unnamed 'StoryPeople,' who express themselves through hand-stamped print, as if epigrammatically."

Skye established the company headquarters of StoryPeople in downtown Decorah, Iowa, in May 1994. Skye spent the next decade directing the production of wood sculptures, print reproductions, books, greeting card sets and furniture all bearing his trademark "bright colors . . . and hand-lettered stories." He and his family returned to California in 2001 where they remained until 2011, when Skye and his spouse separated. He remained in California until 2015 where he continued to innovate with new stories and new media and created original works on large canvases. In April 2015, he moved back to Iowa to work more closely with his production team at StoryPeople and to collaborate more closely with A Hundred Ways North, a startup focused on workshops and conversations around creativity and community. As he said in a recent interview about those conversations, "We're exploring what it is to be a larger consciousness. [...W]e're also exploring what it is to create stories that allow people to live more fully." He also speaks nationally on the topics of creativity, writing, art and storytelling.

Of his work, Skye says, "I like art that admits to being a part of life. The moments I have with my friends and family are really all that I need. I like to take them and weave them into stories that are filled with laughter and music and lunacy. And they are mostly true, but I'm not telling which parts. . . "
"I have a real quirky view of the world. A century ago I would have been standing on a soapbox in Hyde Park telling people about a better way of seeing."
"[Because] when it's all said and done, everyone should pay attention to the beauty and richness of their lives. One person can't be creative with someone else's guidelines. Do what lights you up. It's much simpler and easier than you think."

Skye's first book of hand-stamped stories and black-and-white line drawings, entitled Mostly True, was first published in August, 1993. Still Mostly True followed in May 1994, and to date Skye's publications include a total of nineteen books.  The book "Cuba: This Moment, Exactly So", Skye's collaboration with photographer Lorne Resnick, was the winner of two major awards in 2016: a gold IPPY from the Independent Publisher Book Awards, and a silver IBPA Benjamin Franklin Award from Independent Book Publishers Association.

tumblecloud
With his experience in design, storytelling and digital collaboration, Skye founded tumblecloud in April, 2008. The intention was to create a new communication platform that "will change the way we view ourselves & the planet. Moving from data to meaning. With tools that will help us remember that we're all creative & beautiful & alive. Tools that will help us remember who we are." With an initial group of angel investors, the company built a browser-agnostic workspace for people to arrange, co-create and publish their collaborations, using integrated tools for manipulating cloud-stored multimedia objects. The company was unable to secure further funding in 2014 and subsequently dissolved.

A Hundred Ways North
In the second quarter of 2015, Skye began a collaboration with Ball State University professor, Fia J Skye (née Wendy Saver), and her company A Hundred Ways North. With his background in story as the fibre of human community and her background in movement, voice, and helping the body to inhabit space fully, they currently lead public and corporate workshops on creativity and collaboration. The workshops "focus on three things: alignment, partnering and creating spaces where learning can happen." They also collaborate with various non-profits around the world, such as JDRF, to help create stories that give voice to the overall mission of each organization. Their first co-authored book, Creative Anarchy, was published by A Hundred Ways North in November, 2015.

Bibliography
 Mostly True (StoryPeople Press, 1993)
 Still Mostly True (StoryPeople Press, 1994)
 Going Somewhere Soon (StoryPeople Press, 1995)
 Strange Dreams (StoryPeople Press, 1996)
 Story People (StoryPeople Press, 1997 (compilation of Mostly True, Still Mostly True, and Going Somewhere Soon)
 Hearing Voices (StoryPeople Press, 1998)
 Trusting Soul (StoryPeople Press, 2000)
 Traveling Light (StoryPeople Press, 2003)
 Some Kind of Ride (StoryPeople Press, 2006)
 Peculiar Times (eBook only) (StoryPeople Press, 2008)
 Marching Bands Are Just Homeless Orchestras, Half-Empty Thoughts Vol. 1 (illustrations) (StoryPeople Press, 2010)
 Theories of Everything (StoryPeople Press, October, 2012)
 Something Like Magic (StoryPeople Press, 2014)
 Cuba: This Moment, Exactly So (stories) (Simon & Schuster, 2015)
 Impossible To Know (StoryPeople Press, 2015)
 Creative Anarchy (A Hundred Ways North, 2015)
 Bring Your Life Back To Life (A Hundred Ways North, 2016)
 Songs of Starlight (Flying Edna, 2019)
 Everyday Angels (eBook only) (Flying Edna, 2020)

References

Further reading 
 Andreas, B (1993). "Hall of Whispers: A Virtual Opera," LEONARDO, Vol. 26, No. 3, pp. 256–257.
 Andreas, B (2009). "The tumblecloud manifesto" Zen Bandit, May, 2009
 Besancon, M (Feb. 6, 2016). "Speaker to share love of creativity with community," Victoria Advocate, pp. B1.
 Brainard, L (June 16, 1994). "Arts and stories lead to StoryPeople," Decorah Journal, p. B8.
 Langton, C (Fall, 1998). "Stories, Sketches, Trunks, and the Art of Life," Vesterheim News, cover.
 Marty, M (July, 1998). "Revising the Map of American Religion," Annals of the American Academy of Political and Social Science, Vol. 558, Americans and Religions in the Twenty-First Century, pp. 14, 15.
 Nathan, J (Sept., 1998). "The StoryPeople: A Publishing Tale," ForeWord, p. 25.
 Saver, W (March, 2016). "About Us" A Hundred Ways North, May, 2016
 Watts Jr., J (May 21, 1995). "Artist's Work Like Prism Held Up to Light of Life," Tulsa World, Sketchbook.
 Webb, J (Dec. 8, 2006). "Slices of life, served with color," Billings Gazette, pp. 2D-3D.
 Wiley, D (Feb. 27, 1995). "His art speaks to people," Des Moines Register, pp. 1A-2A.
 Wilcox, J (Feb. 17, 2016). "Brian Andreas to visit UHV for speaking event," Victoria Advocate, pp. B2.
 Young, L (Nov. 7, 1996). "Funny People Hanging Around At the Library," New York Times, p. C3.

External links 

 

1956 births
American pop artists
American contemporary painters
Postmodern artists
20th-century American painters
American male painters
21st-century American painters
21st-century American male artists
American male writers
John F. Kennedy University alumni
Luther College (Iowa) alumni
Artists from Chicago
Writers from Iowa City, Iowa
Living people
20th-century American sculptors
20th-century American male artists
American male sculptors
Sculptors from Illinois
Artists from Massachusetts